Eidsfoss is a village in Hof municipality, Vestfold county, Norway. It is located near Lake Eikeren.

The village was the site of the Eidsfos Iron Works (Eidsfos Jernverk) which dated to 1697. The iron works was closed in 1873. The village is also the location of the historic Eidsfos Manor (Eidsfos Hovedgård) where the owners and manager of the iron works maintained residence for over 250 years.  The manor house, which reflects both Renaissance and Baroque architecture, dates from approximately 1750.

Historical overview 
1697 Caspar Herman Hausmann enters into an agreement with Baron Gustav Wilhelm von Wedel (1641-1717), owner of Jarlsberg County, and oversees the founding of Eidsfos Jernverk.
1698 First furnace plate is cast, depicting the nine buildings of the ironworks and King Christian V riding a horse.
1795 Peder von Cappelen takes over Eidsfos Jernverk.
1901 Tønsberg–Eidsfoss Line (Tønsberg–Eidsfossbanen) between Eidsfos and Tønsberg is opened. This was shut down in 1938.
1903 Steamer S/S Stadshauptmand Schwartz begins to operate on regular routes on Lake Eikeren.
1904 Eidsfos Church is inaugurated by Bishop A. Chr. Bang (1840-1913).
1915 First power station is commissioned.
1977 Authorities grant permission for the demolition of the workers’ houses on Bråtagata.
1979 Old Eidsfos Foundation (Stiftelsen Gamle Eidsfos) is established, aiming to preserve and restore the old ironworks community. The houses are saved.

References

External links
Gamle Eidsfos
Eidsfos Hovedgård
Eidsfoss on Facebook

 
Villages in Vestfold og Telemark
Holmestrand